GPSolo Magazine is a legal magazine published bimonthly by the General Practice, Solo and Small Firm Division of the American Bar Association (ABA). The magazine is based in Chicago, Illinois.

History and profile
The magazine began its existence under the name The Compleat Lawyer in 1983. GPSolo is devoted to themes of critical importance to lawyers practicing in solo and small firms. Members of the ABA's General Practice, Solo and Small Firm Division receive complimentary subscriptions to GPSolo as one of the benefits of Division membership. Subscriptions are available to nonmembers at a cost of $48 per year or $9.50 per copy.

The popular biannual Technology and Practice Guide features reviews of new technology relevant to the particular needs of general, solo, and small firm lawyers. The magazine also publishes two Best of Sections issues each year featuring top articles from ABA practice group publications.

The remaining issues of the magazine are generally "theme" issues, each concentrating on one general subject area. Areas addressed in recent issues include animal law, the law of leisure, sex and the law, privacy and the law, child welfare, old, big, small, law of learning, internet law, family law, estate planning, risky business, rainmaking, ethics and professionalism, and the care and feeding of clients.

Long-time editor-in-chief Jennifer J. Rose guided the magazine from 1995 until 2007, when Joan Burda assumed the editor-in-chief position. Rose resumed responsibilities as editor-in-chief in August, 2010, retiring in August, 2011. Jeff Allen has been editor-in-chief since then. Formerly published eight times per year, the frequency of GPSolo is bimonthly.

References

External links
 Magazine index

Bimonthly magazines published in the United States
Eight times annually magazines published in the United States
Legal magazines
Magazines established in 1983
Magazines published in Chicago